Zuzanna Shonfield, born Zuzanna Maria Przeworska, (31 January 1919, Warsaw – 1 February 2000, Greater London) was a Polish-born British writer and historian. She is best known as the author of the book The Precariously Privileged (1987) as well as the editor of her husband’s, Andrew Shonfield, works The Use of Public Power (1982) and In Defence of the Mixed Economy (1984).

Life 
Zuzanna Przeworska was born in Warsaw on 31 January 1919 in a Jewish-Catholic family. She was educated by governesses until the age of 12, and then studied in a progressive school. At the age of 16, she went to Roedean girl’s public school in Sussex. In 1938, she entered Somerville College in Oxford where she studied French and German. Soon she got interest in politics, philosophy and economics and joined the Communist party.

In 1942, Przeworska married the economist Sir Andrew Shonfield, whom she assisted in writing his books. The couple had two children, a son and a daughter. After her husband’s death in 1981, Shonfield edited and published his uncompleted works The Use of Public Power (1982) and In Defence of the Mixed Economy (1984). It is known, that she completed the last section of the book and a table on similarities and differences of the two major oil crises.

In 1987, Shonfield published her book The Precariously Privileged where she reconstructs the life of the Marshall family and charts the trials and fortunes, both comic and poignant, which befell these precariously privileged newcomers to London society.

Zuzanna Shonfield died on 1 February 2000 in Greater London.

References 

1919 births
2000 deaths
20th-century English women writers
English people of Polish-Jewish descent
English women non-fiction writers
English economics writers
20th-century English historians
British women historians
Alumni of Somerville College, Oxford
Polish emigrants to the United Kingdom